Mittelzentrum Artern is a former Verwaltungsgemeinschaft ("collective municipality") in the district Kyffhäuserkreis, in Thuringia, Germany. The seat of the Verwaltungsgemeinschaft was in Artern, itself not part of the Verwaltungsgemeinschaft. It was disbanded in January 2019.

The Verwaltungsgemeinschaft Mittelzentrum Artern consisted of the following municipalities:
Borxleben 
Gehofen
Heygendorf
Ichstedt 
Kalbsrieth 
Mönchpfiffel-Nikolausrieth 
Nausitz 
Reinsdorf 
Ringleben 
Voigtstedt

Former Verwaltungsgemeinschaften in Thuringia